Châu Pha is a commune (xã) and village in the district-level town of Phú Mỹ, Bà Rịa–Vũng Tàu province, in Vietnam.

Populated places in Bà Rịa-Vũng Tàu province
Communes of Bà Rịa-Vũng Tàu province